Umesh Dastane (20 October 1956 – 2 August 2020) was an Indian cricketer. He played in sixteen first-class matches between 1978 and 1985. He died from COVID-19, aged 63.

References

External links
 

1956 births
2020 deaths
Indian cricketers
Maharashtra cricketers
Railways cricketers
Place of birth missing
Deaths from the COVID-19 pandemic in India